Abaraeus cuneatus is a species of beetle in the family Cerambycidae which can be found in Grand Batanga, Cameroon.

Description
It is blackish-brown on top and have olive-chocolate coloured and smooth bottom. It have clay coloured tarsi and tibiae. Antenna is pubescent with short white hairs. Legs and bottom are covered with same coloured hairs as well. Its prothorax have a sharp sulci which have large punctures and tubercle.

References

Pteropliini
Endemic fauna of Cameroon
Beetles described in 1903
Beetles of Africa